The Hua Qing minigun is a Chinese Gatling-type machine gun. The weapon is chambered in the 7.62×54mmR round and was introduced at the 2009 Anti Terrorist Trade Show at Beijing.

See also

References

7.62×54mmR machine guns
Medium machine guns
Multi-barrel machine guns
Machine guns of the People's Republic of China